Hypolycaena schroederi is a butterfly of the family Lycaenidae first described by Hisakazu Hayashi in 1984. It is endemic to the Philippines where it is distributed on Mindanao and Samar islands. It is a very rare species.

Its forewing length is 13–14 mm.

References

Hayashi, Hisakazu (1984). "Zwei neue Lycaeniden-Arten von den Philippinen (Lep.: Lycaenidae)". Entomologische Zeitschrift. 94 (21): 311–314.
Treadaway, C. G. (1995). "Checklist of the butterflies of the Philippine Islands (Lepidoptera: Rhopalocera)". Nachrichten des Entomologischen Vereins Apollo. Suppl. 14: 7–118.

Treadaway, Colin G. & Schrőder, Heinz G. (2012). "Revised checklist of the butterflies of the Philippine Islands (Lepidoptera: Rhopalocera)". Nachrichten des Entomologischen Vereins Apollo. Suppl. 20: 1–64.

Butterflies described in 1984
Hypolycaenini